Angelica Olmo (born 18 June 1996) is an Italian triathlete. She competed in the women's event at the 2020 Summer Olympics.

References

External links
 

1996 births
Living people
Italian female triathletes
Olympic triathletes of Italy
Triathletes at the 2020 Summer Olympics
Sportspeople from Pavia
21st-century Italian women